Akku Akbar (also referred as Akbar Jose) is an Indian film director of Malayalam films.

He shot to fame with the 2009 blockbuster film Veruthe Oru Bharya, which had a family theme. He later remade his Bollywood film Gauri: The Unborn in Malayalam as Kana Kanmani (2009).

Filmography
 Mazhathullikkilukkam (2002) (directed with Jose)
 Sadanandante Samayam (2003)  (directed with Jose)
 Gauri: The Unborn (2007)
  Veruthe Oru Bharya (2008)
  Kana Kanmani (2009)
  Vellaripravinte Changathi (2011)
  Bharya Athra Pora (2013)
  Ulsaha Committee (2014)
  Mathai Kuzhappakkaranalla (2014)

Awards and nominations
 Asianet Film Awards
 2008: Best Director: Veruthe Oru Bharya

References

External links
 

Living people
Hindi-language film directors
Malayalam film directors
21st-century Indian film directors
Year of birth missing (living people)